The North-east Curaçao parks and coast Important Bird Area is a 13,554 ha tract of land in Curaçao, a constituent island nation of the Kingdom of the Netherlands in the Dutch Caribbean. It encompasses much of the north-western end of the island, including the Christoffel and Shete Boka National Parks, as well as a strip of coast from there half-way down the northern side of the island. It has been identified as an Important Bird Area by BirdLife International because it supports populations of bare-eyed pigeons and Caribbean elaenias, as well as a major breeding colony of least terns.

References

Important Bird Areas of the Dutch Caribbean
Birds of Curaçao